Habrocestum ignorabile is a jumping spider species in the genus Habrocestum that lives in the Yemen. It was first described in 2007.

References

Salticidae
Spiders described in 2007
Spiders of the Arabian Peninsula
Taxa named by Wanda Wesołowska